Itapecerica da Serra is a municipality in the state of São Paulo in Brazil. It is part of the Metropolitan Region of São Paulo. The name Itapecerica is believed to come from the Tupi language for slippery stone, and da Serra means of the Mountains in Portuguese.

History
Itapecerica da Serra was founded in 1562  by the Jesuit missionaries.  It was one of several settlements  Christianized indians, established around the Colégio de São Paulo de Piratininga (later to become the city of São Paulo) as a first line of defense against raids by hostile Indians.  Besides the local inhabitants, the village incorporated natives from the village of Carapicuíba, brought by bandeirante Afonso Sardinha and priest Belchior Pontes.

References

External links
 Encontra Itapecerica - Find everything about Itapecerica da Serra

Municipalities in São Paulo (state)
Populated places established in 1562